Laura is a genus of crustacean with two species: Laura bicornuta and Laura dorsalis. It is in the family Lauridae.

References 

Lauridae
Maxillopoda genera